Jiba (also Kona, Jukun Wurkum) is a Jukunoid language of Nigeria.

References

Jukunoid languages
Languages of Nigeria